David Duncan (February 17, 1913 – December 26, 1999) was an American screenwriter and novelist.

Biography

He began writing professionally at the age of 33 after about ten years in government. His screenwriting career began in 1953 with the release of his first film and Paramount's first 3-D film, Sangaree. Duncan is remembered for his work in science fiction such as the films Monster on the Campus (1958), The Time Machine (1960)  and Fantastic Voyage (1966). He was credited with writing the English narrative for Rodan (1956). He also wrote for many television series such as National Velvet (1960), The Outer Limits ("The Human Factor", 1963), and Daniel Boone (1964-70). His science fiction novels include Dark Dominion (1954), Beyond Eden (1955), and Occam's Razor (1957). He also wrote six novels outside the genre. Duncan wrote Time Machine: The Journey Back a 48 minute PBS documentary and mini-sequel to George Pal's 1960  movie The Time Machine.

Works

Novels
 Remember the Shadows (1944)
 The Shade of Time (1946)
 The Bramble Bush (1948)  
 The Madrone Tree (1950)
 None But My Foe (1950)
The Serpent's Egg (1950)
 Wives and Husbands (1952)
 Dark Dominion (1954)  
 Beyond Eden (aka Another Tree in Eden)  (1955) 
 The Trumpet of God (1956)
 Occam's Razor (1957)
 Yes, My Darling Daughters (1959)
 The Long Walk Home from Town (1964)

Short stories
 "The Immortals" Galaxy, October 1960

Films
Sangaree (1953)
The White Orchid (1954)
The Black Scorpion (1957)
Monster on the Campus (1958)
The Leech Woman (1960)
The Time Machine (1960)

Television

Men into Space (7 episodes)
My Three Sons (5 episodes)
The Outer Limits (1 episode)
The New Adventures of Huckleberry Finn (4 episodes)
Daniel Boone (21 episodes)

References

External links

1913 births
1999 deaths
20th-century American novelists
American science fiction writers
American male screenwriters
American television writers
American male television writers
20th-century American male writers
20th-century American screenwriters